The Tai Khamti, (Khamti: တဲး ၵံးတီႈ), also known as the Hkamti Shan, or simply as Khamti, are a Tai ethnic group native to the Hkamti Long, Mogaung and Myitkyina regions of Kachin State as well as Hkamti District of Sagaing Division of Myanmar. In India, they are found in Namsai district and Changlang district of Arunachal Pradesh. Smaller numbers are present in Lakhimpur district, Dhemaji district and Munglang Khamti village in Tinsukia district of Assam and possibly in some parts of China. According to 2001 census of India, the Tai Khamtis have a population of 12,890. In Myanmar their total population is estimated at 200,000 people.

The Tai Khamtis who inhabit the region around the Tengapani basin of Arunachal Pradesh were descendants of migrants who came during the eighteenth century from the  Hkamti Long region, the mountainous valley of the Irrawaddy.

The Tai-Khamti are followers of Theravada Buddhism. The Tai-Khamti have their own script for their language, known as 'Lik Tai', which originated from the Shan (Tai) script of Myanmar. Their mother tongue is known as Khamti language. It is a Tai language, closely related to Thai and Lao.

Society 

The Khamti society is divided into classes, each signifying distinct status in the social hierarchy. The chiefs occupy the highest positions, followed by the priests, who wield considerable influence over all ranks. In the past, the slaves constituted the lowest rank.

Culture

Lifestyle and customs 

The Tai-Khamti are very strong believers of Theravada Buddhism. Houses have a prayer room, and they pray every morning and evening by offerings flowers (nam taw yongli) and food (khao tang som). They are traditionally peaceful.

Houses of the Tai-Khampti are built on raised floors with thatched roofs. The roofs are constructed so low that the walls remain concealed. Wooden planks are used for flooring, and the walls are made of bamboo splices.

The Khamti are settled, agriculturists. They use a plough (thaie) drawn by a single animal, either an ox or a buffalo (or even an elephant in olden days).

The Khamti raise crops such as paddy rice (khow), mustard/sesame seeds (nga) and potato (man-kala). Their staple food is rice, usually supplemented by vegetables, meat and fish. They drink a beer made from rice (lau) as a beverage that is not served during festivals. Some of the well-known dishes are khao puk (made out of sticky rice and sesame seeds), khao lam (bamboo rice), paa sa (fresh river fish soup with special herbs), paa som, and nam som among others. Beef is considered taboo.

They are the earliest people to have used tea in India. But there is no substantial documentation of the history of tea drinking in the Indian subcontinent for the pre-colonial period. One can only speculate that tea leaves were widely used in ancient India since the plant is native to some parts of India. The Singpho tribe and the Khamti tribe, inhabitants of the regions where the Camellia sinensis plant grew native, have been consuming tea since the 12th century. It is also possible that tea may have been used under another name. Frederick R. Dannaway, in the essay "Tea As Soma", argues that tea was perhaps better known as "Soma" in Indian mythology.

Language and script 
Khamti is a Southwestern Tai language spoken in Myanmar and India by the Khamti people. It is a Daic language, specifically Kadai, Kam-Tai, Tai, Southwestern, Northwest branch. The language seems to have originated around Mogoung in Upper Myanmar. It is closely related to Thai and Lao languages. The name "Khamti" means "place of gold".

Three dialects of Khamti are known: North Burma Khamti, Assam Khamti, and Sinkaling Khamti. Speakers of Khamti are bilingual, largely in Assamese and Burmese.

The Tai Khamtis have their own writing system called 'Lik-Tai', which closely resembles the Northern Shan script of Myanmar with some of the letters taking divergent shapes. Their script is evidently derived from the Lik Tho Ngok script since hundreds of years ago. There are 35 letters including 17 consonants and 14 vowels. The script is traditionally taught in monasteries on subjects like tripitaka, Jataka tales, code of conduct, doctrines and philosophy, history, law codes, astrology, and palmistry etc. The first printed book was published in 1960. In 1992 it was edited by the Tai Literature Committee, Chongkham. In 2003 it was again modified with tone marking by scholars of Northern Myanmar and Arunachal Pradesh.

Dress 
The traditional Khamti dress of men is a full-sleeved cotton shirt (siu pachai) and multi-coloured sarong (phanoi). The women's dress consists of a long sleeve shirt  (siu pasao), a deep-coloured long sarong (sinh) made from cotton or silk, and a coloured silk scarf (phamai). Married woman wear in plain black long wrap-around sarong (sinn) and above that a shorter green wrap-around cloth (langwat).

Their jewelry consists of bright amber earplugs, coral, beaded necklaces, silver hairpins, bangles and gold ornaments. The Khamti men usually tattoo their bodies.

The Khamti tie their hair into a large knot, which is supported by a white turban (pha-ho). The chiefs wear a long coat made of silk. The hair is drawn up from the back and sides in one massive roll, measuring four to five inches in length. An embroidered band, the fringed and tasseled ends of which hang down behind, encircles the roll.

Arts 

The Khamti are renowned for their craftsmanship. Their sword is known as pha-nap. Their priests are known to be amateur craftsmen, who use wood, bone or ivory to carve religious statues.

It is believed that by shaping ivory handles of weapons they will evince great skill. Their weapons include poisoned bamboo spikes (panjis), spear, bow and arrow, sword, and shield, usually made of rhinoceros or buffalo hide. The Khamti also have firearms which resemble old flint muskets and horse pistols. The sword is carried on the front of the body so that its hilt can be grasped in the right hand if needed.

Dance and drama 

The dance "Ka Poong Tai" is one of the main dramatic art forms of the Tai Khamtis. Unlike many forms of traditional Arunachali dance, the Khamti dance is a dance drama, reflecting the  culture of the Khamti Buddhists.

The traditional folk dances of the Tai Khamtis have their roots in Southeast Asian countries like Thailand and Myanmar. The community has many folk dances and each dance has a religious background. Some of the most widespread Tai Khamti dance dramas are:

 Peacock Dance: Kaa Kingnara Kingnari is a prominent dance among the Tai Khamti. It is a Buddhist belief in nature which depicts the slow and gracious dance of mythical half-human and half-peacock that existed in the Himalayas.
 CockFight Dance: Kaa Kong Tou Kai is a popular dance of Tai Khamti tribe of Arunachal Pradesh. It is performed by two or four people who wear a headgear shaped like the head of the cock, accompanied by the beats of drum (kongpat), cymbals (paiseng) and a set of gongs (mong-seeing). This dance usually shows a fight between two cocks and is inspired by the ancient tradition of entertaining the king with a cockfight.
 Deer Dance: According to the legendary story, deer-dancing (kaa-toe) in the month of October (Nuen-Sip-Eit) is a celebration of the light festival based on the story of the spirits of the people and animals welcoming the return of Buddha after his preaching and thanksgiving to his mother and other spirits. This dancing of Ka-Toe is a Buddhist belief and religious in nature.
 Demon Dance: The demon dance Kaa Phi Phai is another prominent dance and is performed on important social and religious occasions. The theme of this dance revolves around the attainment of the enlightenment by Buddha despite attempts of 'Mara', the king of evil spirits to disturb his deep meditation. Kaa Phi Phai symbolises the victory of the holy over the evil and marks the Buddha's attainment of 'Nirvana'.

Festivals

Sangken is the main festival of the Khamti. It is celebrated on 14 April. The Indian national colours are displayed at the Sangken festival where people irrespective of their tribe, caste, culture, race, etc., participate in the rituals.

The main attraction of the festival is splashing clean water, which is the symbol of peace and purity. The images of Buddha are taken out and after the ceremonial bath. The procession is accompanied by drums, dances, and enjoyment. This holy bath of is an auspicious event. The celebration takes place for three consecutive days. During the celebration, the locals make homemade sweet and distribute them. The exchange of gifts is a common trait of the festival.

There are festivals other than Sangken celebrated throughout the year. Some of the festivals are Poi-Pee-Mau (Tai Khampti New Year), Mai-Kasung-Phai, Khoa-Wa, Poat-Wa, etc.

References

External links 
 Ethnologue Profile
 Buddhist temple gutted in fire
 Significance of Poi Pee Mau
 Taikhampti Namsai blog
 TaiKhampti Youth website

Tribes of Arunachal Pradesh
Tribes of Assam
Ethnic groups in Myanmar
Buddhist communities of Myanmar
Buddhist communities of India
Social groups of Assam
Ethnic groups in Northeast India
Ethnic groups in South Asia